HD 85859 is a single star in the equatorial constellation of Hydra. It has an apparent visual magnitude of 4.88, which is bright enough to be visible to the naked eye. It is moving away from the Earth with a heliocentric radial velocity of 50.5 km/s.

At the age of 4.34 billion years, it is a red clump star, which indicates it is on the horizontal branch and is generating energy through helium fusion at its core. The star has 1.55 times the mass of the Sun and is radiating 178 times the Sun's luminosity from its enlarged photosphere at an effective temperature of 4,415 K.

References

K-type giants
Horizontal-branch stars
Hydra (constellation)
Durchmusterung objects
085859
048559
3919